Vitrinella is a genus of minute sea snails, marine gastropod mollusks or micromollusks in the family Vitrinellidae.

Distribution
This marine genus occurs off Gulf of Oman, New Caledonia, Fiji, Indonesia, Japan, the Philippines, Singapore and Australia (New South Wales, Northern Territory, Queensland, South Australia and Victoria)

Species

 Vitrinella aguayoi (Corgan, 1968)
 Vitrinella anneliesae De Jong & Coomans, 1988
 Vitrinella annulifera (Dautzenberg, 1910)
 Vitrinella anomala (d'Orbigny, 1842)
 Vitrinella aristata Rubio, Fernández-Garcés & Rolán, 2011
 Vitrinella berryi Bartsch, 1907
 Vitrinella bifilata Carpenter, 1857
 Vitrinella bushi Dautzenberg, 1912
 Vitrinella calliglypta Aguayo, 1949
 Vitrinella campylochila Pilsbry & Olsson, 1952
 Vitrinella canaliculata Rubio, Fernández-Garcés & Rolán, 2011
 Vitrinella caperata (Tate, 1899)
 Vitrinella columbiana Bartsch, 1921
 Vitrinella contracta (Vanatta, 1913)
 Vitrinella cupidinensis Van Regteren Altena, 1966
 Vitrinella dalli (Bartsch, 1911)
 Vitrinella eshnaurae Bartsch, 1907
 Vitrinella filifera Pilsbry & McGinty, 1946
 Vitrinella floridana Pilsbry & McGinty, 1946
 Vitrinella fortaxis Pilsbry & Olsson, 1952
 Vitrinella funiculus (Dall, 1892)
 Vitrinella goniomphala Pilsbry & Olsson, 1952
 Vitrinella guaymasensis Durham, 1942
 Vitrinella helicoidea C. B. Adams, 1850
 Vitrinella hemphilli Vanatta, 1913
 Vitrinella kaykayae Rolán & Sellanes, 2004
 Vitrinella lucasana (Baker, Hanna & Strong, 1938)
 Vitrinella magister Pilsbry & Olsson, 1952
 Vitrinella margarita Pilsbry & Olsson, 1952
 Vitrinella martensiana (Hertlein & Strong, 1951)
 Vitrinella modesta C. B. Adams, 1852
 Vitrinella multispiralis Pilsbry & Olsson, 1952
 Vitrinella naticoides Carpenter, 1857
 Vitrinella oldroydi Bartsch, 1907
  † Vitrinella opsitelotus (Dall, 1892)
 Vitrinella pelorcei Rubio, Fernández-Garcés & Rolán, 2011
 Vitrinella politurae Rolán & Rubio, 1999
 Vitrinella ponceliana de Folin, 1867
 Vitrinella prominula (A. Adams, 1861)
 Vitrinella proxima Pilsbry & Olsson, 1952
 Vitrinella pseudoaristata Rubio, Fernández-Garcés & Rolán, 2011
 Vitrinella pusilla (L. Pfeiffer, 1840)
 Vitrinella smithi Bartsch, 1927
 Vitrinella solaris Rubio, Fernández-Garcés & Rolán, 2011
 Vitrinella stearnsi Bartsch, 1907
 Vitrinella stephensae (Baker, Hanna & Strong, 1938)
 Vitrinella subquadrata Carpenter, 1857
 Vitrinella tiburonensis Durham, 1942
 Vitrinella tryoni Bush, 1897
 Vitrinella urdunica Bandel, 2010
 Vitrinella williamsoni Dall, 1892
 Vitrinella zonitoides (Hertlein & Strong, 1952)

Species brought into synonymy
 Vitrinella (Docomphala) arifca Bartsch, 1915: synonym of Lodderena arifca (Bartsch, 1915)
 subgenus Vitrinella (Striovitrinella) Olsson & McGinty, 1958: synonym of Solariorbis Conrad, 1865
 Vitrinella agulhasensis Thiele, 1925: synonym of Parviturbo agulhasensis (Thiele, 1925)
 Vitrinella alaskensis Bartsch, 1907: synonym of Rissoella alaskensis (Bartsch, 1907)
 Vitrinella bicaudata Pilsbry & McGinty, 1946: synonym of Tomura bicaudata (Pilsbry & McGinty, 1946)
 Vitrinella blakei Rehder, 1944: synonym of Solariorbis blakei (Rehder, 1944)
 Vitrinella cerion Dall, 1927: synonym of Mikro cerion (Dall, 1927)
 Vitrinella congoensis Thiele, 1925: synonym of Circulus congoensis (Thiele, 1925)
 Vitrinella diaphana (d'Orbigny, 1842): synonym of Vitrinella pusilla (L. Pfeiffer, 1840)
 Vitrinella elegans Olsson & McGinty, 1958: synonym of Solariorbis elegans (Olsson & McGinty, 1958)
 Vitrinella georgiana Dall, 1927: synonym of Cirsonella georgiana (Dall, 1927)
 Vitrinella holmesii Dall, 1889: synonym of Cochliolepis holmesii (Dall, 1889)
 Vitrinella inclinans Barnard, 1963: synonym of Skenea inclinans (Barnard, 1963)
 Vitrinella interrupta C. B. Adams, 1850: synonym of Parviturboides interruptus (C. B. Adams, 1850)
 Vitrinella megastoma C. B. Adams, 1850: synonym of Teinostoma megastoma (C. B. Adams, 1850)
 Vitrinella mooreana Vanatta, 1904: synonym of Solariorbis mooreanus (Vanatta, 1904)
 Vitrinella multicarinata Dall, 1889: synonym of Episcynia multicarinata (Dall, 1889)
 Vitrinella novemcarinata (Melvill, 1906): synonym of Lodderia novemcarinata (Melvill, 1906)
 Vitrinella panamensis C. B. Adams, 1852: synonym of Cyclostremiscus panamensis (C. B. Adams, 1852)
 Vitrinella praecox Pilsbry & McGinty, 1946: synonym of Vitrinella helicoidea C. B. Adams, 1850
 Vitrinella rhyssa Dall, 1927: synonym of Xyloskenea rhyssa (Dall, 1927)
 Vitrinella sculptilis Garrett, 1873: synonym of Circulus sculptilis (Garrett, 1873) 
 Vitrinella semisculpta Olsson & McGinty, 1958: synonym of Circulus semisculptus (Olsson & McGinty, 1958)
 Vitrinella tenuisculpta Aguayo & Borro, 1946: synonym of Vitrinella aguayoi (Corgan, 1968)
 Vitrinella terminalis Pilsbry & McGinty, 1946: synonym of Solariorbis terminalis (Pilsbry & McGinty, 1946)
 Vitrinella texana D. R. Moore, 1965: synonym of Circulus texanus (D. R. Moore, 1965)
  † Vitrinella truncata Gabb, 1881: synonym of Solariorbis truncatus (Gabb, 1881)
 Vitrinella valvatoides C. B. Adams, 1852: synonym of Cyclostremiscus valvatoides (C. B. Adams, 1852)
Taxa inquirenda
 Vitrinella carinifex  Dall, 1927
 Vitrinella massarita Dall, 1927
Nomine dubia
 Vitrinella carinata (d'Orbigny, 1842)
 Vitrinella cyclostomoides (Pfeiffer, 1840)
 Vitrinella hyalina C. B. Adams, 1850
 Vitrinella tincta C. B. Adams, 1850

References

 Adams, C.B. 1850. Monograph of Vitrinella. Amhurst, Massachusetts Vol. 3 pp. 10.
 Iredale, T. 1924. Results from Roy Bell's molluscan collections. Proceedings of the Linnean Society of New South Wales 49(3): 179-279, pls 33-36
 Iredale, T. 1930. Some notable name changes. The Australian Zoologist 6(2): 175
 Laseron, 1956, Records of the Australian Museum, 24(11): 174
 Rolán E., 2005. Malacological Fauna From The Cape Verde Archipelago. Part 1, Polyplacophora and Gastropoda

Vitrinellidae